The 1898–99 Scottish Second Division was won by Kilmarnock with Abercorn finishing bottom.

Table

References

Scottish Football Archive

Scottish Division Two seasons
2